Osterøy is an island situated northeast of the city of Bergen in Vestland county, Norway. Osterøy is covered by two municipalities: the majority by Osterøy municipality, and the rest by Vaksdal municipality. The vast majority of the island's population lives in Osterøy municipality (7,305 inhabitants as of 2008).

The island is surrounded by fjords with mainland Norway on all sides of those fjords. The Osterfjorden-Romarheimsfjorden flows along the north side, the Sørfjorden flows along the southern and western sides, and the Veafjorden flows along the eastern side.

There are two road bridges that connect the island to the rest of the road network in Norway.  The first is the Osterøy Bridge, built in 1997 on the southwestern tip of the island.  That bridge is the only road connection to the mainland for most residents of Osterøy.  The other is the Kallestadsundet Bridge which connects the northeastern tip of the island to the mainland.  The northeastern part of Osterøy only has one road, and it is not connected to the rest of the roads on the island, so to get from the northeastern part of the island to the rest of the island, one would have to cross the Kallestadsundet Bridge to leave the island, drive  along the mainland to the opposite side of the island, then cross the Osterøy Bridge to get back onto the island.  This is why the northeastern part of the island is part of Vaksdal municipality and the rest of the island is part of Osterøy municipality.

Media gallery

References

Osterøy
Vaksdal
Islands of Vestland